Luis Germán Astete (Lima, 28 May 1832 – Huamachuco, 10 July 1883) was a Peruvian politician and sailor, hero of the War of the Pacific. He died fighting in the Battle of Huamachuco.

Biography 
He was the son of Pedro de Astete Núñez and María Manuela Fernández de Paredes y Noriega (granddaughter of the Marquises of Salinas). Baptized in the Government Palace, his godfather was Marshal Gamarra, president of the Republic.

He studied at the Real Convictorio de San Carlos in Lima. Then he entered as a midshipman at the Military School in 1850, and that same year he embarked on the frigate Algerie and later on the Serieuse, in which he was sent to France.

In 1853, with the rank of Ensign, he joined the crew of the newly built frigate Amazonas, on his trip to Peru from England. In 1854 he was appointed commander of the schooner Hector, but he mutinied along with the political prisoners he had on board, who were banished to Mexico. Captured by the Vigilante, he was prosecuted and banished to Chile. Soon he returned to Peru, residing in Arequipa, where he remained until the Battle of La Palma, victory of the rebels that put an end to the government of José Rufino Echenique, in early 1855.

In 1856, he married Peregrina Guerrero y Álvarez Calderón, niece of the Count of Álvarez Calderón. The couple had six children.

He ascended to second lieutenant in March of 1855, and served in the ships Liberty and Guise, being discharged again by his support during the Peruvian Civil War of 1856–1858 to general Vivanco, in January of 1857.

Elected deputy for Huaraz in the legislature of 1860-1864, he resigned his promotion to corvette captain considering it incompatible with his political function. On board the steam Sachaca, participated in the Battle of 2 May, 1866 against the Spanish Squadron of the Pacific.

Once the constitutional government was restored in 1868, he was promoted to frigate captain. In 1871 he obtained his indefinite license, and in that state, he had active participation in the uprising in favor of Nicolás de Piérola against President Mariano Ignacio Prado. Then he took command of the Huáscar ironclad, on board of which he was appointed commander of the National Regenerative Squadron. In that position, he faced the Royal Navy ships Shah and Amethyst in the Battle of Pacocha, on May 29, 1877. After this battle, which ended inconclusively, the rebels surrendered in Iquique to the forces loyal to president Prado.

At the outbreak of the War of the Pacific, and already with the rank of captain, was commissioned to acquire weapons and a ship in the United States, a task that was interrupted, due to political swings. Back to Peru, he was named prefect of Callao and commander of the batteries during the defense of the port before the blockade of the Chilean squadron. He fought in the battles of San Juan and Miraflores, and had to order the destruction of several boats to prevent them from falling into enemy hands (January 1881).

After Lima was occupied by the Chileans, he marched to the sierra and was elected deputy from Alto Amazonas to the National Assembly meeting in Ayacucho, but he did not join it and preferred to take up arms, joining the resistance of the Sierra led by Andrés A. Cáceres. He participated in the battles of Marcavalle and Pucará, and Concepción. In the battle of Huamachuco he had under his command the 4th Army Division of the Center and died as a result of a shot that pierced his forehead.

References

Bibliography

External links

1832 births
1883 deaths
Members of the Chamber of Deputies of Peru
Peruvian military personnel killed in action
People from Lima
Peruvian sailors
Peruvian Navy personnel of the War of the Pacific
Military personnel killed in the War of the Pacific